The Treaty of Demarcation and Exchange Some Portuguese Possessions and Dutch in the archipelago of Solor and Timor (Portuguese: Tratado de Demarcação e Troca de Algumas Possessões Portuguesas e Neerlandesas no Arquipélago de Solor e Timor) was a treaty signed between the Kingdom of Portugal (Dom Pedro V) and the Netherlands (William III), on 20 April 1859, which set the demarcation of the colonies of the two kingdoms in the Indonesian Archipelago.

They represented as plenipotentiaries by the Portuguese side António Maria de Fontes Pereira de Melo, then Minister of Affairs of the Kingdom of Portugal and by the Dutch side Maurits Jan Heldewier, chargé d'affaires of the Netherlands.

By treaty, Portugal ceded Larantuca, Sicca and Paga on the island of Flores, Wouré on the island of Adonara, and Pamung Kaju on the island of Solor. In return, the Netherlands ceded the kingdom of Maubara and Ambeno, on the island of Timor, as well the island of Ataúro. The treaty was ratified on 18 August 1860.

Treaty Articles 
The treaty, written in French and translated into Portuguese, contained the following articles:

 sets the boundaries between Portuguese and Dutch possessions on the Island of Timor;
 recognition of the sovereignty of each Kingdom over its possessions;
 sets the limits of Oecusse (or Oikoussi);
 Portugal's recognition of the sovereignty of the Netherlands in the western part of Timor;
 ceding to Portugal of Maubara and Ambeno, who already "fly the Portuguese flag";
 the Netherlands gives up any claim to the island of Ataúro;
 Portugal cedes the islands of Flores, Larantuca, Sicca and Paga; on Adonara Island, the state of Wouré and on Solor Island, the state of Pamang Kaju;
 the Netherlands comes into full possession of the above territories;
 in compensation, the Netherlands gives a discharge of 80 thousand florins borrowed in 1851  and should pay another 120 thousand florins, delivered a month after the ratification of the treaty;
 freedom of worship in the exchanged territories is guaranteed;
 the treaty should be submitted to the parliaments of the respective kingdoms for exchange of ratifications, to be carried out in Lisbon.

References

History of East Timor
History of Indonesia
1859 in Portugal
1859 in the Netherlands
Lisbon (1859)
Lisbon (1859)
Lisbon (1859)
Lisbon (1859)
Lisbon (1859)